Mohamed Remili (born 31 May 1985 in Hussein Dey, Algiers Province) is a footballer who plays as a winger for III. Kerületi TVE in  Nemzeti Bajnokság II.

Career
He joined Újpest FC from Szolnoki MÁV FC in June 2008. and then on 8 August 2009 he moved to Vasas Budapest.

Career statistics

Club

Honours 

 Hungarian Cup
 Runners-up : 2016–17

References

External links
 HLSZ
 

1986 births
Living people
People from Hussein Dey (commune)
Hungarian people of Algerian descent
Algerian people of Hungarian descent
Algerian footballers
Hungarian footballers
Association football forwards
Lombard-Pápa TFC footballers
Újpest FC players
Szolnoki MÁV FC footballers
Vasas SC players
Paksi FC players
BFC Siófok players
III. Kerületi TUE footballers
Nemzeti Bajnokság I players
Nemzeti Bajnokság II players